When I Go is a 1998 album by American folk duo Dave Carter and Tracy Grammer.

Track listing 
All songs written by Dave Carter.
 "When I Go" – 4:16
 "Don't Tread on Me" – 3:23
 "Annie's Lover" – 2:52
 "Grand Prairie TX Homesick Blues" – 3:23
 "Kate and the Ghost of Lost Love" – 4:24
 "The River, Where She Sleeps" – 4:20
 "Lancelot" – 4:44
 "Frank to Valentino" – 3:09
 "Little Liza Jane" – 5:08
 "Elvis Presley" – 4:42

Credits 
Musicians:
 Dave Carter – guitar, banjo, bass & vocals
 Tracy Grammer – violin, mandolin, guitar & vocals
 Eric Park – harmonica & accordion

Production:
 Produced by Dave Carter & Tracy Grammer
 Recorded in Tracy Grammer's kitchen in Portland, Oregon, except "Frank to Valentino", recorded in Donny Wright's garage, Portland, Oregon.
 Mixed by Mark Frethem, Doctor Digital, Portland, Oregon.
 Mastered by David Glasser, Airshow Mastering, Inc., Boulder, Colorado

Artwork:
 Photography in Acoma Pueblo (in the U.S. state of New Mexico) by Kathleen Williams, Majic Glass, Inc.
 Photography of duo by Dan Betenbender
 Graphic design by Tracy Grammer

External links 
 Music page at official Dave Carter and Tracy Grammer web site (lyrics and sound samples)
 Music page at official Tracy Grammer web site (lyrics and sound samples)

Notes and sources 

1998 debut albums
Dave Carter and Tracy Grammer albums
Tracy Grammer albums